Miguel Jerónimo de Ballesteros (also Miguel Jerónimo de Vallesteros) (died 1555) was a Roman Catholic prelate who served as the second Bishop of Coro (1546–1555).

Biography
Bishop Miguel Jerónimo de Ballesteros (Vallesteros) served as the dean of the Cathedral of Cartagena. On August 22, 1546, he was appointed by the King of Spain and confirmed by Pope Paul III as the second Bishop of Coro where he served until his death in 1555. He was a leading activist with the Counter Reformation in the New World.

References

External links and additional sources
 (for Chronology of Bishops) 
 (for Chronology of Bishops) 

1555 deaths
Bishops appointed by Pope Paul III
Roman Catholic bishops of Coro